Futurista may refer to:

Futurista (Ryuichi Sakamoto album), 1986
Futurista (Pidżama Porno album), Polish-language album 1996
Ferenc Futurista (1891-1947), Czechoslovak film actor